Richard Chester Macke was a naval aviator and rear admiral in the United States Navy.  He last served as Commander of United States Pacific Command (USPACOM) from July 19, 1994 until January 31, 1996. 
After his navy career, Macke served as a vice president of Wheat International Communications Corporation.

Naval career
Macke graduated from the United States Naval Academy with a Bachelor of Science degree in 1960. After graduation, he reported to flight training at NAS Pensacola, Florida. After training at several other air stations, he was designated a Naval Aviator in August 1961. He then reported to Attack Squadron 23 (VA-23) at NAS Lemoore, California and flew A-4 Skyhawks from the aircraft carrier .

In 1965, Macke was selected for Test Pilot Training and entered the United States Navy Test Pilot School at NAS Patuxent River, Maryland. Following graduation, he served in the Weapons System Test Directorate of the Naval Air Test Center, participating in the initial trials of the A-7A, Corsair II aircraft. He next went to VA-27, flying A-7s and completing more than 150 combat missions in Southeast Asia from the aircraft carrier .

Macke reported to the United States Naval Postgraduate School in February 1970, where he graduated with distinction with a Master of Science degree in operations research and systems analysis.

In January 1975, Macke was assigned to the Navy Office of Legislative Affairs in the Pentagon, where he was involved in presenting the Naval Aviation Program budget to members of Congress and their staffs.

Macke served a short tour as the Executive Assistant to the Navy Director of Command and Control in the Pentagon prior to reporting to the nuclear-powered aircraft carrier  as Commanding Officer on July 6, 1984. During his tour on the Dwight D. Eisenhower, the ship was awarded the Battle "E" as the most combat-ready aircraft carrier on the East Coast of the United States. Macke relinquished command on October 18, 1986.

Macke was selected for flag rank and reported as the commander of the Naval Space Command, where he led initiatives to enhance space support to tactical warriors. Next, he reported as the commander of Carrier Group Two in March 1988 and in January 1990 was selected for sequential command and became commander of Carrier Group Four. Macke was then nominated by President George H. W. Bush to serve in the grade of vice admiral as the Director for Command, Control, Communications and Computer (C4) System (J6) on the Joint Staff in the Pentagon. In December 1992, General Colin Powell chose Macke to serve as the Director of the Joint Staff.

Macke was nominated and confirmed for the four-star grade of admiral and left the Joint Staff to become the Commander in Chief, United States Pacific Command in July 1994.

1995 Okinawan rape incident

Macke was relieved from his post at the Pacific Command in November 1995, hours after making comments considered insensitive to reporters about the case of United States sailors and a marine accused of kidnapping, beating and raping a 12-year-old Japanese girl: "I think it was absolutely stupid. I have said several times: for the price they paid to rent the car [used in the crime], they could have had a girl."

Macke retired from the navy on April 1, 1996 as a two-star rear admiral, two stars lower than the rank he previously held. Later that year, he was censured by the navy for matters related to an extramarital affair he had before his retirement with an unidentified female Marine Corps lieutenant colonel.

Awards and decorations

Involvement in Greenville incident

Macke was   responsible for arranging for the presence of civilians on board the  prior to its 2001 collision with the Ehime Maru, a Japanese boat carrying high school students. At the request by Macke, a civilian was at the helm of the submarine when the accident occurred. Nine Japanese civilians aboard the Ehime Maru were killed.

Macke refused to testify at the court of inquiry of Commander Scott Waddle, the commanding officer of the USS Greeneville at the time of the accident.

References

External links
 http://www.defenselink.mil/news/Apr1995/m042595_m102-95.html
 The Virginian-Pilot: Admiral who was forced to quit is hired by international firm (March 16, 1996)

1938 births
20th-century American naval officers
United States Navy personnel of the Vietnam War
Living people
Recipients of the Defense Distinguished Service Medal
Recipients of the Defense Superior Service Medal
Recipients of the Legion of Merit
United States Naval Academy alumni
United States Navy admirals
United States Naval Aviators